Kapag Tumibok Ang Puso: Not Once, But Twice is a Filipino comedy drama film, starring Ramon Bong Revilla Jr., Ai-Ai delas Alas, and Precious Lara Quigaman.

The film marked its first time team up of Ai-Ai delas Alas and Senator Bong Revilla and also served for fellow newcomer and also Bb. Pilipinas International 2005 and Beauty Queen, Commercial Model turned actress Precious Lara Quigaman as her first film project.

Plot
When a freak accident occurs, a recently widowed man named Marco Bong Revilla encounters the most unassuming person he will ever meet than even fall in love with named Love Ai-Ai delas Alas but trials and tribulations begin when their children are involved as the pressures begin with their romance whirling but an unkind past comes back to haunt Love.

Cast
Ramon "Bong" Revilla Jr. as Marco
Ai-Ai delas Alas as Love
Precious Lara Quigaman as Sara
Eugene Domingo as Adora
Inah Revilla as Sabrina
Deejay Durano as Louie
Ketchup Eusebio as Brad
Janelle Jamer as Honey
Kiray Celis as Precious
Aaron Junatas as Marky
Special participation
Bobby Andrews
Chokoleit

Soundtrack
The film's main theme comes from the same title from the film "Kapag Tumibok Ang Puso" a cover and single by Toni Gonzaga as the film's main soundtrack and also was originally popularized by Donna Cruz in the 90's.

References

External links
https://web.archive.org/web/20111114135507/http://www.watchfilipinomovies.com/kapag-tumibok-ang-puso/
http://www.filmbug.com/asin/B000HLDC9S
http://www.imdb.com/title/tt0820911/releaseinfo

2000s Tagalog-language films
2006 comedy-drama films
2006 films
Films directed by Wenn V. Deramas
Philippine comedy-drama films
2000s English-language films